Dean Israelite (born September 20, 1984) is a South African film director, writer, and producer, best known for directing the found footage film Project Almanac, the 2017 reboot of Power Rangers, and the 2019 reboot of Are You Afraid of the Dark.

Early life 
Israelite was born and raised in Johannesburg, South Africa, and studied Dramatic Art at the University of the Witwatersrand. He moved to Australia and graduated in Film and Television from Curtin University, then earned his MFA from the American Film Institute. His cousin is director Jonathan Liebesman. He is of Jewish background.

Career 
Israelite started his career with writing and directing several short films, including Acholiland.

In 2015, Israelite made his feature film directing debut with the found footage science fiction thriller Project Almanac, based on the script by Jason Pagan and Andrew Deutschman. Michael Bay produced the film, which was released on January 30, 2015 by Paramount Pictures, grossing more than $32 million with a budget of $12 million. Israelite directed Lionsgate's Power Rangers film (2017), based on the screenplay by John Gatins, with a story by Matt Sazama, Burk Sharpless, Michelle Mulroney and Kieran Mulroney, which was released on March 24, 2017 by Lionsgate Films, grossing $142.3 million against a production budget of $100 million. It was a box office failure, losing the studio an estimated $74 million, when factoring in all revenues and expenses.

Future and cancelled projects 
In February 2014, Israelite was among the directors who were being eyed by the Marvel Studios to direct the superhero film Doctor Strange, but later in June 2014 Scott Derrickson was confirmed as director.

In June 2014, Israelite was set to direct the remake of the 1983 film WarGames for Metro-Goldwyn-Mayer, based on the script by Arash Amel.

Israelite is set to direct Unexplained Phenomenon from the screenplay by Andrew Deutschman & Jason Pagan, for Amblin Entertainment and The Picture Company.

Filmography 
 Battle: Los Angeles (2011) – assistant to Jonathan Liebesman
 Project Almanac (2015) – director
 Power Rangers (2017) – director

References

External links 
 

Living people
People from Johannesburg
South African film directors
South African screenwriters
South African film producers
University of the Witwatersrand alumni
Curtin University alumni
AFI Conservatory alumni
1984 births
South African Jews